Boana beckeri is a species of frog in the family Hylidae. It is endemic to Brazil and is only known from a handful of localities in southern Minas Gerais and adjacent northeastern São Paulo. The specific name beckeri honors Johann Becker, Brazilian zoologist who collected many of the types.

Description
Adult males measure  and adult females  in snout–vent length. The tympanum is distinct. The eyes are prominent. The fingers and toes bear terminal discs and are partially webbed. The dorsum has four narrow longitudinal light brown stripes, intercalated by three brown stripes outlined by a cream line. There is also a pair of dark brown lateral stripes, delimited by a white-silvery line above and by a narrow white-silvery stripe below. Males have a single subgular vocal sac.

There are two types of male advertisement calls. Type "a" call is "harsh" call consisting of a single pulsed note. Type "b" call is a trill of unpulsed notes.

Habitat and conservation
Males have been observed calling during nighttime perched on bushes or grasses at the margins of small streams and ponds. It appears to be locally common. As of late 2020, the listing of this species in the IUCN Red List of Threatened Species dates from 2006 when it was only known from a single population. At the time, Boana beckeri was considered "data deficient".

References

Boana
Amphibians of Brazil
Endemic fauna of Brazil
Amphibians described in 2004
Taxa named by Ulisses Caramaschi
Taxonomy articles created by Polbot